Máximo Antonio Montoya Martine (born ) is a Venezuelan male volleyball player. He was part of the Venezuela men's national volleyball team at the 2014 FIVB Volleyball Men's World Championship in Poland. He played for Apure.

Clubs
  Apure (2014)

References

1989 births
Living people
Venezuelan men's volleyball players
Place of birth missing (living people)
21st-century Venezuelan people